AIST cruise missile -  latest development of the Belarusian State Military Industrial Committee. The cruise missile is a high precision short-range subsonic cruise missile developed in close cooperation with Ukrainian and Chinese experts.

Overview
The likeliest missile launcher for the cruise missile Aist is supposed to be the universal multiple launch rocket system (MLRS) Polonez, based on a wheeled chassis MZKT-7930 Astrolog.

Vehicles of this type are widely used as a platform for a number of weapon systems, mainly those produced in Russia.  Belarusian 4x4 wheeled chassis, in particular, are used as a platform for the Russian Iskander short-range ballistic missile system and the Pakistani Hatf VII Babur cruise missile.

The ground chassis will comprise all the necessary components of a combat and launcher-loader vehicle. Each combat vehicle will mount two or three missiles.

Aist cruise missile is equipped with a turbofan engine for subsonic cruise missiles and unmanned aerial vehicles MS-400 produced by the Ukrainian enterprise Motor Sich. The Chinese DF-10 (CJ-10) cruise missile as well as the Pakistani Hatf VII Babur cruise missile are also equipped with this type of engine.

Specifications (with MS-400 turbofan engine)
 maximum cruise thrust – 400 kgf;
 fuel consumption – up to 0.8 kg/kgf;
 diameter – 320 mm;
 length (with extended exhaust line) – 1100 mm;
 height (including engine mount components) – 455 mm;
 gross empty mass – 85 kg.
 gross launching mass – about 1500 kg;
 combat load – 350 kg; length – 6 m;
 diameter – 0,57 m; wingspan – 2,7 m;
 range – 500 km; missile velocity – up to 900 km/h.

References

Guided missiles